The Fiat G.2 was an Italian three-engine six-passenger monoplane transport aircraft designed by Giuseppe Gabrielli and built by Fiat.

Development
The G.2 was an important step for the Fiat company as their first low-wing cantilever monoplane. The structure was all-metal, with fabric-covered control surfaces. The wide-track tailwheel undercarriage was not retractable, and its mainwheels were covered by spats. The tailwheel (not a tailskid) was castering (free-pivoting).

The aircraft was powered by three Fiat A.60 inline piston engines, with one mounted on the fuselage nose and the other two in wing-mounted nacelles. Variants were also produced with other engine installations. The enclosed cabin had space for six passengers.

The prototype first flew in 1932.

Although the G.2 represented a promising design, it failed to sell and operated only a limited service with the ALI airline between Turin and Milan.

Variants
G.2
Variant powered by three 101 kW (135 hp) Fiat A.60 inline piston engines.
G.2/2
Variant powered by three Alfa Romeo 110-1 engines.
G.2/3
Variant powered by three 89 kW (120 hp) de Havilland Gipsy Major engines.
G.2/4
Variant powered by three Fiat A.54 radial engines.

Operators

Aerovias Minas Gerais
Varig

ALI

Specifications (G.2)

Notes

photo of FIAT G.2 with Brazil's VARIG 1940 airline service

References

 The Illustrated Encyclopedia of Aircraft (Part Work 1982-1985), 1985, Orbis Publishing, Page 1796

G.002
1930s Italian airliners
Trimotors
Low-wing aircraft